Boves is a commune in the Somme department in Hauts-de-France in northern France.

Geography
Boves station has rail connections to Amiens, Compiègne and Creil.

Population

History
 c640 : The birthplace of Saint Godeberta
 c1166 : The birthplace of medieval author Jean de Boves.
 July 1185 : Philippe-Auguste signed  the treaty acquiring part of Picardy.
 August 1835 : Victor Hugo visited the ruins of the château.

Places of interest
 Ruins of the fortified 12th-century château
 Notre-Dame de la Nativité church
 Saint-Ladre marshland nature reserve

See also
Communes of the Somme department

References

Communes of Somme (department)